Gyong Kangri is a mountain peak located at  above sea level, near the north end of the Saltoro Mountains, a subrange of the Karakoram range.

Location 
Peak's west flank is drained by the Gyong Glacier, while the east flank lies in the Nubra river basin. On the opposite side of Gyong Glacier, in a west-southwest direction, rises the Gharkun , at a distance of 11 km. Gyong La Pass crossing is 4.3 km north of Gyong Kangri. Chumik Kangri ), which is also on the main ridge, is 11 km north-west of the peak.

The peak act as a marker for the Actual Ground Position Line in the Siachen Area of Kashmir.

Climbing history 
No ascents of Gyong Kangri are documented.

References 

Mountains of the Karakoram
Wikipedia requested photographs by location